Earle Harold Munn (November 29, 1903 – June 6, 1992), also known as E. Harold Munn, was an American politician who served as the vice presidential and presidential nominee of the Prohibition Party and as its chairman. He is currently the most recent Prohibition Party presidential nominee to receive over 20,000 votes.

Life

Earle Harold Munn was born on November 29, 1903, to Earle Orren Munn and Ealla Carrie Deming in Bay Village, Ohio. He attended Greenville College and in 1928, he graduated from the University of Michigan with a master's degree and from 1927 to 1937 he served as a teacher at Central Academy and College and later became a professor at Greenville College.

During the 1932 presidential election he supported Herbert Hoover in an attempt to save prohibition, but Hoover was defeated in a landslide. In 1941, he ran for a seat on Michigan board of regents as a member of the Prohibition Party. In 1947 he became the chairman of the Michigan Prohibition Party and later ran for governor twice in 1952 and 1954. In 1959, he ran for a seat on the Coldwater Board of Education and won the election.

Presidential

In 1955, he was elected as the national chairman of the party without any opposition. During the 1960 presidential election the Prohibition Party's national convention was held in Winona Lake, Indiana and on September 3, 1959, Rutherford Decker and Munn were given the presidential and vice-presidential nominations by ninety five delegates.

On August 27, 1963, around three hundred delegates attended the Prohibition National Convention in Chicago, Illinois and voted to give the party's presidential nomination to Munn and its vice-presidential nomination to Mark R. Shaw and in the general election he received 23,267 votes. On June 29, 1968, fifty six delegates attended the convention in Detroit, Michigan and voted to give him the presidential nomination again with Rolland E. Fisher as his running mate and in the general election he received 15,123 votes. On June 25, 1971, Munn won the presidential nomination again on the first ballot at the national convention in Wichita, Kansas with Marshall E. Uncapher as his running mate and received 13,497 votes in the general election.

On June 6, 1992, he died in Hillsdale, Michigan at age 88.

Electoral history

References

1903 births
1992 deaths
20th-century American politicians
1960 United States vice-presidential candidates
American temperance activists
Candidates in the 1964 United States presidential election
Candidates in the 1968 United States presidential election
Candidates in the 1972 United States presidential election
Michigan Prohibitionists
Prohibition Party (United States) vice presidential nominees
Prohibition Party (United States) presidential nominees
University of Michigan alumni